Fur and Gold is the debut studio album by English singer Bat for Lashes. It was released on 11 September 2006 by The Echo Label. It was met with critical acclaim and received a nomination for the 2007 Mercury Prize. In 2007, the album was re-released through Parlophone. Fur and Gold spawned the singles "The Wizard", "Trophy", "Prescilla", and "What's a Girl to Do?". In 2008, "What's a Girl to Do?" was re-released as a 12-inch vinyl with a remix featuring Scroobius Pip and Plaid. As of April 2009, Fur and Gold had sold 27,000 copies in United States.

Music
Journalist Garry Mulholland wrote that singer Natasha "Khan and producer David Kosten reinvent Siouxsie / [Kate] Bush/ Björk mystical sex, musical travelogue and poetic dreamstate for the contemporary singer-songwriter milieu". Magic described the song "What’s A Girl To Do?" as such: "starting with an original drumbeat of the Ronettes and embracing modernity in the form of a rudimentary drum machine, before returning to its 1960's trademarks with the help of a simple drum. Not to spoil anything, the chorus irremediably evokes the divine "Arabian Knights" of Siouxsie and the Banshees".

Critical reception

Fur and Gold received widespread acclaim from music critics. At Metacritic, which assigns a normalised rating out of 100 to reviews from mainstream publications, the album received an average score of 81, based on 15 reviews.

Track listing

Personnel
Credits adapted from the liner notes of Fur and Gold.

Musicians

 Natasha Khan – vocals, string arrangements ; keyboards ; piano ; percussion ; drums ; Hammond organ ; autoharp ; guitar, vibraphone ; sounds ; harmonium 
 Abi Fry – viola ; string arrangements 
 Caroline Weeks – autoharp ; backing vocals ; guitar 
 Mary Funnell – violin ; string arrangements 
 Anna McInerney – violin ; string arrangements 
 Tim Byford – drums 
 Josh T. Pearson – guitar ; backing vocals ; intro vocals 
 Ben Christophers – bass, guitar 
 Sophie Sirota – violin 
 Howard Gott – violin 
 Emma Ramsdale – harp 
 Tim Hutton – trumpet, trombone 
 Rachael T. Sell – backing vocals 
 Will Lemon – spoken word intro 
 Mikee Goodman – vocal sea sounds 
 David Kosten – keyboards ; special foot taps ; additional keyboards, programming

Technical
 David Kosten – production, recording, mixing
 Natasha Khan – production
 Tim Young – mastering

Artwork
 Bohdan Cap – cover photo
 Peter Moyse – band photo
 Natasha Khan – album artwork
 Red Design – design, layout

Charts

Certifications

Release history

References

External links
 David Shankbone interviews Natasha Khan for Wikinews

2006 debut albums
Bat for Lashes albums
Parlophone albums